Vehil (also Romanized as Vehīl) is a village in Garmeh-ye Jonubi Rural District, in the Central District of Meyaneh County, East Azerbaijan Province, Iran. At the 2006 census, its population was 13, in four families.

References 

Populated places in Meyaneh County